Robert Hunt (born July 22, 1975) is an American football coach and former guard. He graduated from Virginia and played in the NFL for the Tampa Bay Buccaneers (drafted in the 7th round in 1999) and in NFL Europe for Frankfurt Galaxy (2000).

Early years
Hunt played high school football at Menchville High School in Newport News, Virginia, where he was a second-team Associated Press Group AAA all-state selection as a senior at offensive guard.

Professional career
Hunt was drafted by the Tampa Bay Buccaneers in the seventh round (226th overall) of the 1999 NFL Draft.

Coaching career

Omaha Nighthawks
Hunt was named assistant offensive line and offensive quality control coach for the Omaha Nighthawks of the United Football League on February 23, 2011.

References

Further reading

1975 births
Living people
Sportspeople from Hampton, Virginia
Virginia Cavaliers football players
Frankfurt Galaxy players
Amsterdam Admirals coaches
Toronto Argonauts coaches
Omaha Nighthawks coaches
Bridgewater Eagles football coaches
American expatriate sportspeople in Germany
American expatriate sportspeople in the Netherlands
American expatriate sportspeople in France
American expatriate sportspeople in Canada
Howard Bison football coaches
Ferrum Panthers football coaches
New York/New Jersey Hitmen players
San Francisco Demons players